Muhammad Ibrahim Siddiqui (8 March 1930 – 9 June 2002) was an Indian Barelvi Islamic scholar who was born in West Bengal and died in Mauritius. He was particularly influential in Mauritius, where he founded the Sunni Razvi Society.

Education, Career and Sufi permissions
Siddiqui memorized the Quran by the age of 13 and graduated in Fazil-e-Darsi Nizami in 1956. He undertook his first Hajj with his teacher and guide, Sardar Ahmad. He received successorship and teaching licences in 1957 from Shah Muhammad Ibrahim Raza Khan Jilani Mian in 1376 (1957) and was appointed as faculty at the Darul Uloom Rehmania and Jama Masjid Gukarkhan, as principal and Khateeb (lecturer).

He also received teaching licenses from Sufi master Ejaaz Wali Khan Razvi from Mustafa Raza Khan Qadiri Razvi Nuri, Ziauddeen Qadiri Razvi and from Sufi master Taqaddus Ali Khan (son-in-law of Hujjatul Islam).

Service in Mauritius
In 1965, Siddiqui established the Sunni Razvi Society International in Mauritius, formed on the directions of Mustafa Raza Khan Qadri. The organisation spread to France, Holland, Kenya, Pakistan, Sri-Lanka, Suriname and South Africa.
During his 1970 visit to Durban, South Africa, he gave lectures on the importance and significance of loving the Islamic prophet Muhammad and debated with Tablighi Jamaat members.

Siddiqui has composed and sung in praise of Mauritius, especially when it gained independence and its status as a republic.

His friends included the Governor-general, Leonard Williams and Sir Raman Osman, former Prime Minister of Mauritius Seewoosagur Ramgoolam, Anerood Jugnauth, A. Pasooraman (Minister Of Education, Arts and Culture).

He began organizing continuous weekly Thursday study circles at the Jummah Mosque. On 20 February 1983, Siddiqui laid the foundation stone on a large piece of land which had been donated by a disciple. The first weekly study circle occurred on 14 April 1983 under his patronage.

Works
His works include:
 Path of Salvation
 Maqaam-e-Siddiq-e-Akbar Ba Kalaam-e-Ibrahim Khushtar- a biography of Abu Bakr.
 On the Holiest Earth of Islam - Guidance for Hajj and Umrah.
 Fragrance of Khushtar - Islamic poetry book 
 Preparations for Death
 Mystical teachings

References

External sources 
 Official website of the Sunni Razvi Society

1930 births
2002 deaths
People from West Bengal
Indian imams
Sufi poets
Indian Sufi religious leaders
Indian Sufis
Sunni Sufis
20th-century poets
Barelvis
Mauritian Muslims
Mauritian Sufi religious leaders